Gülümse is Sezen Aksu's Turkish release and her most commercially successful album in Turkey. The album sold more than 2 million and is one of the best-selling Turkish album. Sezen Aksu on this album again worked with Onno Tunç and Aysel Gürel.

Track listing

Personnel

Kudret Coşkun: Executive-producer
Onno Tunç: Producer, all instruments and arrangements, except for the following (1,2,3,4,5,6,8,10)
Aykut Gürel - Sound engineer
Duyal Karagözoğlu - Sound engineer
Curtis Schwartz - Mixing
Sertab Erener - Vocal (1,7)
Levent Yüksel - Vocal (1,7)
Seden Gurel - Vocal (1,7)
Arto Tunçboyacıyan - Supervisor, percussion instruments (2,3,4,5,8) Vocal (2,3,4,8)
Ahmet Kadri Rizeli - kemenche (4)
Tamer Pınarbaşı - Kanun (4)
Ara Dinkjian - Ud (6)
Celal Bağlan: darbuka (7)
Seyfi Hayta: Def (7)
Serdar Erbaşı: Hollo, Bendir (7)
Reyhan Dinletir: Bongo (7)
İlyas Tetik: Violin (7)
Ergin Kızılay: Ud (7)
Atilla Özdemiroğlu - Instruments and arrangements (7)
Sevingül Bahadır: Vocal (7)
Ercan Irmak: Ney, Kavala (9)
Özkan Uğur - Bass Guitar (9)
Fuat Güner - Acoustic Guitars, Musical Instruments and regulations (9)
Orhan Topçuoğlu - Percussion instruments (10)

Charts

All-time charts

References

External links
 
 

1991 albums
Sezen Aksu albums
Turkish-language albums